Events from the year 1996 in the British Virgin Islands.

Incumbents
Governor: David Mackilligin
Chief Minister: Ralph T. O'Neal

July
 8 July 1996 - Hurricane Bertha strikes the British Virgin Islands.

Footnotes

 
1990s in the British Virgin Islands
British Virgin Islands